ABCI or ABCi may refer to:
 Aden Bowman Collegiate
 Association of Baptist Churches in Ireland
 Association of Baptist Churches in Israel
 AI Bridging Cloud Infrastructure, a Japanese supercomputer under development
Australian Bureau of Criminal Intelligence, precursor of the Australian Criminal Intelligence Commission